The 1971–72 Liga Alef season saw Maccabi Petah Tikva (champions of the North Division) and Hapoel Marmorek (champions of the South Division) win the title and promotion to Liga Leumit.

North Division

South Division

References
Liga Alef (Final tables) Maariv, 25.6.72, Historical Jewish Press 
Previous seasons The Israel Football Association 

Liga Alef seasons
Israel
2